"Move on Fast" is a song by Yoko Ono, originally released in 1972 on the album Approximately Infinite Universe, and on the B-side to the single "Now or Never". The song was later included on Ono's compilation album Onobox.

Composition
In contrast to the folksy Dylan-esque single "Now or Never" song that the song was originally released as a B-side to, "Move on Fast" is described by Yoko Ono as an "offbeat pop/rock sound", which also draws from bop, big band swing, and "razor-sharp feminist rock."  Ben Urich and Ken Bielen described the song as "a straight-ahead rocker that hits the ground running and never lets up."  They also praise John Lennon's guitar playing.  John Lennon biographer Jon Wiener claimed that the song has a "furious rock beat."  He described Ono's vocal as employing "a nervous, blank voice that qualifies as proto-New Wave."

Chart performance
The song became Yoko Ono's sixth consecutive number-one hit on the Billboard Hot Dance Club Songs chart and her eighth number-one hit overall.

Track listing
Digital download (Disc One)
 "Move on Fast" (Richard Morel Radio Edit) – 4:25
 "Move on Fast" (Richard Morel Vocal) – 7:54
 "Move on Fast" (Timmy Loop Bluelight Club) – 7:14
 "Move on Fast" (Nacho Chapado & Ivan Gomez Vocal) – 8:59
 "Move on Fast" (TWISTED Sound+Vision Club) – 7:18
 "Move on Fast" (Ralphi Rosario Dub) – 8:15
 "Move on Fast" (Richard Morel Dub) – 7:17
 "Move on Fast" (Timmy Loop Infinity Dub) – 6:27
 "Move on Fast" (Nacho Chapado & Ivan Gomez Dub) – 6:59
 "Move on Fast" (TWISTED Sound+Vision Dub) – 4:43

Digital download (Disc Two)
 "Move on Fast" (Emjae Club) – 6:40
 "Move on Fast" (Chris the Greek Club) – 8:02
 "Move on Fast" (Digital Dog Club) – 6:10
 "Move on Fast" (Yiannis Acceleration Club) – 7:43
 "Move on Fast" (Emjae Dubstramental) – 6:40
 "Move on Fast" (Emjae Underwater Dub) – 4:53
 "Move on Fast" (Chris the Greek Dub) – 5:56
 "Move on Fast" (Digital Dog Dub) – 6:25
 "Move on Fast" (Yiannis Acceleration Dub) – 7:44
 "Move on Fast" (Digital Dog Radio Edit) – 3:41
 "Move on Fast" (Yiannis Acceleration Radio Edit) – 3:40

Digital download (Disc Three)
 "Move on Fast" (Dave Audé Club Mix) – 7:55
 "Move on Fast" (Dave Audé Club Dub) – 7:24
 "Move on Fast" (Dave Audé Dub Dub) – 7:24
 "Move on Fast" (Dave Audé Mixshow) – 6:25
 "Move on Fast" (Dave Audé Radio Mix) – 4:26
 "Move on Fast" (Wawa Club Mix) – 7:11
 "Move on Fast" (Wawa Dub) – 5:56
 "Move on Fast" (Wawa Club Instrumental) – 7:11
 "Move on Fast" (Wawa Radio Mix) – 3:56

Charts

Weekly charts

Year-end charts

See also
 List of number-one dance singles of 2011 (U.S.)

References 

Yoko Ono songs
1972 songs
2011 singles
Song recordings produced by Yoko Ono
Song recordings produced by John Lennon
Songs written by Yoko Ono
Plastic Ono Band songs